Larry Clifton Perkins  (born 18 March 1950) is a former racing driver and V8 Supercar team owner from Australia.

Biography

Early years
Growing up on a farm in Cowangie in the Mallee region of Victoria, Larry, the son of racing driver Eddie Perkins who had won the 1956 RedeX Round Australia Trial and maternal nephew of Bathurst 500-winner George Reynolds, developed a love for cars from a young age and loved tinkering with the farm machinery. In 1970 he was recruited as a mechanic/driver for Harry Firth's Holden Dealer Team, and although he didn't do much road racing for the team, he did race in Rallycross alongside team driver Peter Brock, and was also involved with the development of the stillborn Holden LJ Torana GTR XU-1 V8 project which was canned in mid-1972 by the "Supercar scare".

Racing career
After winning the TAA Formula Ford "Driver To Europe" Series in 1971 and the Australian Formula 2 Championship in 1972 (both times in an Elfin 600), Perkins travelled to Europe where he won the 1975 European Formula Three Championship. He also raced in Formula One during the 1974, 1976 and 1977 seasons. After failing to secure a permanent drive in Formula One he returned to Australia, winning the Rothmans International Series in 1979 in an Elfin MR8 for the Ansett Team Elfin factory team run by Elfin Sports Cars founder Garrie Cooper, and the 1979 Australian Rallycross Championship in a Volkswagen Beetle. During 1982 and 1983 he worked with brother Garry on the construction of The Quiet Achiever solar car. He was one of the drivers of the car during the transcontinental solar crossing of Australia, the car using only a photovoltaic solar cell source. During these years he met with success in Australian Touring Cars and in 1988 he returned to Europe to race at the Le Mans 24 Hour with Tom Walkinshaw Racing, finishing 4th.
 
After returning home from Europe, Perkins made his Bathurst 1000 debut in 1977 in a Holden LX Torana SS A9X Hatchback where he finished third with Peter Janson. He went on to win the race six times (1982, 1983, 1984, 1993, 1995, 1997), with co-drivers Peter Brock (1982–84), John Harvey (1983) (all for the Holden Dealer Team which by then was owned by Brock with Perkins in charge of race car building and preparation), Gregg Hansford (1993) and in his last two wins in 1995 and 1997 with Russell Ingall, winning each time in an Australian developed Holden Commodore.

Arguably his most memorable win was in the 1995 Tooheys 1000 in which he dropped to last place after a pit stop at the end of the first lap to replace a flat tyre, and subsequently gained the lead with less than 10 laps remaining after the Ford Falcon of Glenn Seton retired having dropped a valve in the engine. Perkins and co-driver Russell Ingall thus became only the second driving combination in the history of the race to recover from last place to win the event. Perkins has however, never won an Australian Touring Car Championship, his best championship results being three fourth places.

Formula One

Perkins made his first appearance in Formula One at the 1974 German Grand Prix for Chris Amon Racing. With regular driver and team owner Chris Amon sidelined with sinusitis after just one practice lap, Perkins took over in the AF101, failing to qualify after crashing on the second day of practice.

In 1976 he signed a deal with the works Boro team, for the team's first season. He made his first Formula One start at the Spanish Grand Prix, finishing 13th before achieving a seasons best result of 8th at the following race in Belgium. He failed to qualify at Monaco and retired from the Swedish Grand Prix after blowing an engine. With the team's money drying up, Perkins only made two further appearances in a Boro, retiring from the Dutch and Italian Grands Prix, and after Boro's withdrawal, was left without a drive. He replaced Rolf Stommelen at Brabham for the final three races of the year, finishing in 17th position in Canada and retiring from the remaining two races.

For the beginning of 1977, the Australian secured a drive for Stanley BRM, the remnants of the once great BRM team. After his car failed to be delivered on time for the opening Grand Prix, he made his first appearance at the Brazilian Grand Prix, albeit 12.1 seconds off the pace and retiring after one lap. Lapped five times before finishing 15th in South Africa, Perkins lost his seat to Conny Andersson at the beginning of the European season. He had a brief stint at Surtees, finishing 12th in Belgium and failing to qualify in Sweden. At the French Grand Prix, he drove in Friday practice, but was replaced by Patrick Tambay the next day. This marked the end of Perkins' brief and unsuccessful Formula One career.

Retirement and legacy
Perkins retired from driving in 2003, aged 53 and was inducted into the V8 Supercars Hall of Fame in 2008. In addition to his racing credentials as a driver he is an accomplished automotive engineer and engine-builder having built many race cars for both his own team and for other racing teams. He is well known for his outgoing and humorous personality. His nickname is "LP", but he is often referred to as "Lightning Larry" or "Larrikin Larry". Larry is the father of V8 Supercar race winner Jack Perkins.

On 7 December 2017, the "Larry Perkins Trophy" was named in his honour. It is awarded to the driver who accumulates the most points across the four races at the Beaurepaires Melbourne 400, the Supercars event supporting the Australian Grand Prix.

In 2018 Perkins and his brother Peter discovered the lost cache of equipment left behind in the Simpson Desert by explorers Henry Vere Barclay and Ronald MacPherson in 1904. The explorers had been forced to abandon the load, which included camel tanks, tools, scientific equipment and personal belongings, in order to cross sandhills to get to a water source. The Perkins' discovery was described as a "highly significant archaeological find".

In the 2021 Queen's Birthday Honours Perkins was appointed a Member of the Order of Australia for "significant service to motorsport as a touring car driver and team owner".

Racing record

Career summary

Complete Formula One World Championship results
(key)

Complete World Sportscar Championship results
(key) (Races in bold indicate pole position) (Races in italics indicate fastest lap)

Complete World Touring Car Championship results
(key) (Races in bold indicate pole position) (Races in italics indicate fastest lap)

† Not eligible for series points

Complete Asia-Pacific Touring Car Championship results
(key) (Races in bold indicate pole position) (Races in italics indicate fastest lap)

Complete 24 Hours of Le Mans results

Complete Bathurst 1000 results

References

External links
 Larry Perkins  Comprehensive Biography and Race Record

1950 births
Members of the Order of Australia
24 Hours of Le Mans drivers
Amon Formula One drivers
Australian Formula 2 drivers
Australian Formula One drivers
Australian Touring Car Championship drivers
Bathurst 1000 winners
Brabham Formula One drivers
BRM Formula One drivers
Boro Formula One drivers
FIA European Formula 3 Championship drivers
Formula Ford drivers
Living people
Racing drivers from Victoria (Australia)
Surtees Formula One drivers
Supercars Championship drivers
World Sportscar Championship drivers
Australian Endurance Championship drivers
Jaguar Racing drivers
Dick Johnson Racing drivers